Lawley and Overdale is a civil parish in the district of Telford and Wrekin, Shropshire, England.  The parish contains four listed buildings that are recorded in the National Heritage List for England.  All the listed buildings are designated at Grade II, the lowest of the three grades, which is applied to "buildings of national importance and special interest".  The parish is mainly suburban, and the listed buildings consist of the remains of a tramway bridge, a railway tunnel, a house, and a church.


Buildings

References

Citations

Sources

Lists of buildings and structures in Shropshire